MSG The Warrior Lion Heart is a 2016 Indian science fantasy adventure film co-directed by criminal religious leader Gurmeet Ram Rahim Singh and his daughter Honeypreet Insan. The film starring Singh, one of the directors himself, is a story of a medieval warrior fighting against aliens for the honour of his land.

The film premiered on 6 October 2016 in Delhi and was released on 7 October 2016 in Hindi, with dubs in Tamil, Telugu, Malayalam and English. Singh is credited with work in thirty film departments, including choreography, editing, make-up and hair design, background scoring, and prop design. The film has been criticised as a propaganda film by several critics.

Synopsis 
The story is about a medieval warrior who fights for the honor of his land and the dignity of the womenfolk. The story travels centuries apart as he emerges in another role as a modern Indian equivalent of James Bond, a stylish top secret agent. The marauding aliens run amok, as they are hundreds of years ahead in technology. Lionheart is their only stumbling block in their march to overpower planet Earth.

Cast
 Gurmeet Ram Rahim Singh
 Honeypreet Insan
 Charanpreet
 Kainaat
 Garima
 Rajesh
 Sukhottam
 Ashok
 Bhushan
 RZA
 Gaurav Insan
 Gaurav mahaur

Marketing 
A number of world and regional records were organised by sect leader Ram Rahim to promote the film. According to Guinness World Records, MSG fans assembled the world's largest poster on 15 September 2016, which covered  and featured an advertisement for MSG: The Warrior Lion Heart. The largest display of oil lamps consists of 150,009 lamps achieved at an event organised Singh to promote film among 36 Lakh fans. The film's second song "Sohna Mera Mishri Di Daliye" was unveiled in an event attended by around 40 lakh people.

Release 
The movie premiered on 6 October in Delhi and was released on 7 October in Hindi, along with dubbed versions in Tamil, Telugu, Malayalam and English. The film was declared tax-free by Government of Rajasthan in the state.

Critical reception 
Devarsi Ghosh of India Today wrote "MSG The Warrior Lion Heart is not a film. Like the previous MSG (Messenger of God) films, this too is a propaganda piece made by the subject of the said propaganda, Gurmeet Ram Rahim Singh himself". Mihir Bhanage of The Times of India gave it 1.5 stars out of 5, describing the film as indicative of Singh's self-obsession. Bhanage wrote, "It takes guts to roll out such preachy and glorified films, but the saga continues with a devil-may-care attitude."

Anshu Lal of Firstpost described the film as "horrible". Specific criticism was centered on problems in storytelling, such as the use of pop-up video. Lal wrote, "Because without that pop-up, how would the poor audience comprehend the concept of background narration, right?" Lal also criticised the plot, the acting, and the cartoonish nature of the film. Namrata Thakker of Rediff.com gave it half star out of 5, and wrote that it is only for die-hard fans of Singh's. Aakash Karkare of Scroll.in wrote that movie is every bit as terrible as you expect it to be.

Box office 
According to The Times of India the film collected approximately 32 million in its first weekend with an estimated total of 46 million after five days. Box Office India tallied the worldwide gross at approximately 176.7 million. According to Bollywood Hungama the film collected approximately 1.13 million in just one week. International Business Times stated that movie had a gross of 1.50 million.

Soundtrack

The music is composed by Gurmeet Ram Rahim Singh. The soundtrack album consists of 2 songs, all written and sung by Singh, himself.

Track listing

References

External links
 
 

2010s Hindi-language films
2016 films
2016 action drama films
2010s action adventure films
2010s fantasy adventure films
2016 war drama films
Indian action drama films
Indian action adventure films
Indian fantasy adventure films
Indian war drama films
Films set in Haryana
Film controversies in India